The 20th International Emmy Awards took place on November 23, 1992 in New York City. The award ceremony, presented by the International Academy of Television Arts and Sciences (IATAS), honors all programming produced and originally aired outside the United States.

Ceremony 
The nominees for the 20th International Emmy Awards were selected by an international panel of television industry judges. More than 250 programs were written for the awards. The United Kingdom received eight nominations, a number considered low compared to previous editions, followed by Canada with seven mentions. The winners were announced on November 23, 1992, at the Sheraton New York Times Square Hotel. The International Academy awarded the Directorate Award to the Italian Silvio Berlusconi and to Bill Cosby the Founders Award.

Broadcast
The ceremony was produced by Joe Cates, and broadcast for more than 20 countries. In the PBS network was air a one-hour version displayed on November 29, 1992.

Winners

References

External links 
 

International Emmy Awards ceremonies
International
International